Yadiki is a village in Anantapur district of the Indian state of Andhra Pradesh. It is the mandal headquarters of Yadiki mandal in Anantapur revenue division.

Yadiki Caves lie midway between Gooty and Tadipatri. The cave system is in the village of Konapulappadu which is 18 km from Yadiki village. Geemanugavi cave is 5 km in length and visitors can go up to 2 km inside..

If someone wants Pattu Sarees for marriage or for some other function, they can get perfect matching from here. Silk clothes are sold  even to famous Dharmavaram from this village. Nearly 70% of people have this occupation.

References 

Villages in Anantapur district
Mandal headquarters in Anantapur district